Adjarra is a town and commune in Ouémé Department, Benin.The commune covers an area of 112 square kilometres and as of 2013 had a population of 97,424 people.

References

Communes of Benin
Arrondissements of Benin
Populated places in the Ouémé Department